The Sermon of Ali ibn Husayn in Damascus are the statements of Ali ibn Husayn in the presence of Umayyad caliph Yazid I. After the Battle of Karbala, the captured family of Muhammad, the prophet of Islam, and the heads of those killed were moved to the Levant by the forces of Yazid. By order of Yazid, a pulpit was prepared, and a public speaker gave a lecture that placed blame on Ali and Husayn ibn Ali.In reply to the Yazid's speaker, Ali Ibn Husayn;introduced himself and his descendants. Also, he recounted the events leading to the death of Husayn ibn Ali.

Ali ibn Husayn 

Ali ibn Husayn, also known as Zayn al-Abidin ("Adornment of the Worshippers"), was the fourth Shia Imam, after his father Husayn. Ali ibn Husayn survived the Battle of Karbala and was taken, along with enslaved women, to the caliph in Damascus. Eventually, he was allowed to return to Medina, where he led a secluded life with a few intimate companions. Zayn al-Abidin's life and statements were entirely devoted to asceticism and religious teachings, mostly in the form of invocations and supplications. His famous supplications are known as Al-Sahifa al-Sajjadiyya.

Background 
After the Battle of Karbala, the captured family of the prophet Muhammad and the heads of those killed were moved to the Levant by the forces of Yazid. According to Turabi, on the first day of Safar they arrived in the Levant (Damascus) and were taken into Yazid's presence.
 
According to Bihar al-Anwar, Yazid ordered a pulpit to be constructed in Damascus. He designated a public speaker to blame Ali and Husayn ibn Ali. The public speaker sat at the pulpit and began his lecture by praising Allah and insulting Ali and his son, Husayn. Also, he devoted a long time to praising Yazid and his father Muawiyah. In the middle of the lecture, Ali ibn Husayn called out to him and said: "O you who preach! Woe be to you! You have bought the wrath of the Creator in lieu of the pleasure of the creatures, while your place is hell." Then he turned towards Yazid and said: "Do you permit me to speak that which would be agreeable to Allah and would be a means of reward for those present?" Yazid refused, but the people said, "Permit him to ascend the pulpit. Perhaps we may hear something (worthwhile) from him." Yazid replied, "If I permit him to mount the pulpit, he shall not descend it until he humiliates me and the progeny of Abu Sufyan." They said, "How could this ailing youth do such a thing?' Yazid replied, "He comes from a family that has from infancy consumed wisdom along with their milk." Yazid finally relented, and Ali ibn Husayn ascended the pulpit and gave his sermon.(According to Kamile Bahai, Ali ibn Husayn asked Yazid to let him give the sermon on Friday.)

Context 
Ali ibn Husayn began his sermon by praising Allah.

Then he said about the knowledge, forbearance, munificence, eloquence, valor, and friendship of Ahl al-Bayt and also the name of Hamza ibn Abdul-Muttalib and Ja'far ibn Abi Talib.

He drew attention to criteria that indicated the eligibility of Ahl al-Bayt for the succession of Muhammad, the prophet of Islam. It was in this way that he introduced himself, saying that there was no need to introduce himself to people who knew him, but that he was introducing himself for those who did not know him.

The son of Mecca and Mina 

Ali ibn Husayn introduced himself as son of Mecca and Mina.

With these sentences, he stated that his ancestors reached back to Abraham, who had constructed the Kaaba. He added that it was important to remember that people who honor the Kaaba must revere Ali ibn Husayn as the son of Mecca. In other words, anyone who did not respect Ali ibn Husayn was, in fact, blaspheming all that was sacred.

The son of Muhammad

The son of Ali

The son of Fatimah bint Muhammad

The son of who was killed at battle of Karbala

Call to pray 
When Ali ibn Husayn said these statements, Yazid ordered the moazzin to call people for prayers. While the mu'azzin said: "I bear witness that Muhammad is the Messenger of Allah", Ali ibn Husayn stated:

Yazid knew that it was in his best interest not to answer, so he ordered the mu'azzin to continue.

Effect 
After delivering the sermon, those in the audience began to cry. They gathered around Ali ibn Husayn to apologize.

See also 
Sermon of Zaynab bint Ali in the court of Yazid
Battle of Karbala

References 

Husayn ibn Ali
Battle of Karbala
Shia Islam
Islamic sermons